Goodenia racemosa is a species of flowering plant in the family Goodeniaceae and is endemic to Queensland. It is an erect undershrub with linear or narrow oblong leaves and racemes of vivid yellow flowers.

Description

Taxonomy and naming
Goodenia racemosa was first formally described in 1859 by Ferdinand von Mueller in Fragmenta Phytographiae Australiae from specimens collected near the Burnett River.

In 1990, Roger Charles Carolin described G. racemosa var. latifolia and the name and that of the autonym are accepted by the Australian Plant Census:
The subspecies name (latifolia) means "wide leaf".

Distribution and habitat
The latifolia variety grows in rocky situations in Isla Gorge and the autonym is found on the Carnarvon Range and Blackdown Tableland.

Conservation status
Both varieties of G. racemosa are listed as of "least concern" under the Queensland Government Nature Conservation Act 1992.

References

racemosa
Flora of Queensland
Plants described in 1859
Taxa named by Ferdinand von Mueller